Shelter Island Conference on Quantum Mechanics in Valence Theory was held in 1951. It was also sponsored by the National Academy of Sciences. 

The Nobel Laureate Robert S. Mulliken organized the meeting. The other participants were Theodore H. Berlin, Bryce L. Crawford, Charles A. Coulson, Henry Eyring, Joseph Hirschfelder, George E. Kimball, Masao Kotani, Sir John Lennard-Jones, Per-Olov Lowdin, D. A. McInnes, Henry Margenau, Joseph E. Mayer, William Moffitt,  Robert G. Parr, Linus Pauling, Kenneth S. Pitzer, Clemens C. J. Roothaan, Klaus Ruedenberg, Harrison Shull, John Clarke Slater, Leslie E. Sutton, C. W. Ufford, John H. Van Vleck, George Wheland, and Michael P Barnett.  

In 1981, J.C. Light wrote, in an issue of The Journal of Physical Chemistry, that it presented papers from a conference that was "merely the latest in a long sequence of ... conferences ... on theoretical chemistry spanning 3 decades ..." followed by a list that began with the Shelter Island conference. In 1996, Parr wrote "The fall of 1951 was an exciting time for quantum chemistry ... the Shelter Island Conference on Quantum-Mechanical Methods in Valence Theory ... was singularly important ... ".

References

Chemistry conferences
History of science and technology in the United States
Academic conferences
1951 in science
1951 conferences
1951 in New York (state)
Science events in the United States